The following are the Kuwait national football team results in its official international matches.

1990s

2000s

2010s

2020s

External links
FIFA.com
World Football Elo Ratings: Kuwait

 
Results